Oxandra is a genus of flowering plants in the soursop family, Annonaceae.

Selected species
 Oxandra lanceolata (Sw.) Baill.
 Oxandra laurifolia (Sw.) A.Rich.
 Oxandra leucodermis (Spruce ex Benth.) Warm.

References

External links

Annonaceae
Annonaceae genera
Taxonomy articles created by Polbot